Headphones are a pair of small speakers mounted on a band for placing on one's head.

Headphones may also refer to:

Groups and labels
Headphone Dust, a record label
Headphones (band), an American indie rock band

Albums
Headphones (album), their album of the same name

Songs
 "Headphones" (song), by Little Boots
 "Headphones", by Baker Boy featuring Lara Andallo from the 2021 album Gela
 "Headphones", by Matt Nathanson featuring Lolo
 "Headphones", a song by Jars of Clay from the 2009 album The Long Fall Back to Earth